The Seven Sages of the Bamboo Grove (also known as the Seven Worthies of the Bamboo Grove) were a group of Chinese scholars, writers, and musicians of the third century CE. Although the various individuals all existed, their interconnection is not entirely certain.  Several of the seven were linked with the Qingtan school of Daoism as it existed in the state of Cao Wei.

The Seven Sages found their lives to be in danger when the avowedly "Confucian" Jin dynasty of the Sima clan came to power. Among other things, some of the seven wrote poems criticizing the court and the administration, and wrote Daoist-influenced literature. Not all seven sages had similar views. Some of the seven tried to negotiate their way through the difficult political positions by self-consciously adopting the roles of alcohol-fueled pranksters and eccentrics avoiding government control (for example, Liu Ling), yet some ended up joining the Jin dynasty (for example Wang Rong). However much they may or may not have been personally engaged in "witty conversation or debates" (qingtan), they became the subjects of it themselves in the A New Account of the Tales of the World.

The Seven Sages

The Seven Sages are Ji Kang (嵇康) (aka Xi Kang), Liu Ling (刘伶), Ruan Ji (阮籍), Ruan Xian (阮咸), Xiang Xiu (向秀), Wang Rong (王戎) and Shan Tao (山涛).  Ji Kang was especially close to Ruan Ji; their relationship was described as "stronger than metal and fragrant as orchids".  The wife of Shan Tao was said to be impressed by Ruan Ji and Ji Kang's prowess when she spied on them during sexual intercourse.

As it is traditionally depicted, the group wished to escape the intrigues, corruption and stifling atmosphere of court life during the politically fraught Three Kingdoms period of Chinese history. They gathered in a bamboo grove near the house of Ji Kang in Shanyang (now in Henan province) where they enjoyed, and praised in their works, the simple, rustic life.  This was contrasted with the politics of court. The Seven Sages stressed the enjoyment of alcoholic beverages, cold-food powder personal freedom, spontaneity and a celebration of nature.

It would be Ji Kang's refusal to work for the new regime which would eventually lead to his execution.  The group's rural life became a common theme for art, and they inspired other artists who wished to retreat during times of political upheavals.

Another person associated with the Seven Sages is Rong Qiqi (榮啟期), who in fact lived quite earlier. This association is depicted in some apocryphal art from the fourth century CE, in a tomb near Nanjing.

The Seven Sages, or the symbol that they became, have been remarked to be influential in Chinese poetry, music, art, and overall culture.

Gallery
The Seven Sages of the Bamboo Grove have inspired not only generations of poets, but also painters and other artists.

See also
 Seven Scholars of Jian'an
 Six Dynasties poetry

References

Further reading
 
 
A New Chinese Tomb Discovery: The Earliest Representation of a  Famous Literary Theme in Artibus Asiae, 1961 - Alexander Coburn Soper

External links
 

 
Six Dynasties poets
Chinese culture
Articles about multiple people in pre-Tang China
Chinese Taoists
Septets